Dunedin railway station in Dunedin on New Zealand's South Island, designed by George Troup, is the city's fourth station. It earned its architect the nickname of "Gingerbread George".

Early rail in Dunedin
Dunedin was linked to Christchurch by rail in 1878, with a link south to Invercargill completed the following year, and the first railway workshops were opened at Hillside in South Dunedin in 1875. Early plans were for a grand main station on Cumberland Street, but these did not get further than the laying of a foundation, and a simple temporary weatherboard station was built next to the site in 1884. It took close to 20 years for government funding to be allocated, and planning only really commenced as the 19th century was drawing to a close.

The logistics of constructing what was at the time New Zealand's busiest railway station took three years before construction began in 1903. Dunedin required a station for a wide range of activities: it was a commercial and industrial centre, close to gold and coalfields, with a hinterland that was dependent on livestock and forestry for its economy.

Construction
In an eclectic, revived Flemish renaissance style, (Renaissance Revival architecture), the station is constructed of dark basalt from Kokonga in the Strath-Taieri with lighter Oamaru stone facings, giving it the distinctive light and dark pattern common to many of the grander buildings of Dunedin and Christchurch. Pink granite was used for a series of supporting pillars which line a colonnade at the front. The roof was tiled in terracotta shingles from Marseilles surmounted by copper-domed cupolas. The southern end is dominated by the 37-metre clocktower visible from much of central Dunedin.

The booking hall features a mosaic floor of almost 750,000 Minton tiles. A frieze of Royal Doulton porcelain runs around the balcony above it from which the floor's design, featuring a locomotive and related symbols, can be clearly seen. The main platform is the country's longest, extending for about 500 metres.

The foundation stone was laid by the Minister of Railways Joseph Ward on 3 June 1904. The Prime Minister Richard Seddon was also present. The station was officially opened by Ward, by then Prime Minister, on 12 November 1906. Construction was kept within budget, and cost £40,000.

History
In its early days the station was the country's busiest, handling up to 100 trains a day, including suburban services to Mosgiel and Port Chalmers, railcars to Palmerston and the Otago Central Railway and other trains to Christchurch and Invercargill. The city's economic decline and the reduction in the prominence of rail transport means that only a handful of trains use the station today.

The station used to have dock platforms at both the north and south ends and a crossover midway along the main platform. Large shunting yards, most of which have now gone, occupied land to the south. Much of this land has now been subdivided into wholesale and light industrial properties.

With the decrease in passenger rail traffic, the station now serves more functions than the one for which it was designed. Bought by the Dunedin City Council in 1994, its uses have greatly diversified, though it still caters for the Dunedin Railways tourist trains. Much of the ground floor is used as a restaurant, and the upper floor is home to both the New Zealand Sports Hall of Fame and the Otago Art Society. A produce market is held in the grounds to the north every Saturday morning. Every year in March, the station takes centre stage in the South Island's main fashion show, with the main platform becoming reputedly the world's longest catwalk.

A thorough refurbishment of the exterior took place in the late 1990s, accompanied by the landscaping of the gardens outside the entrance in Anzac Square.

In October 2006 its centenary was celebrated with a festival of railway events, including the operation of eight steam railway locomotives from all over New Zealand. In 2006 it was recognised by DK Eyewitness Travel as one of "The World's 200 Must-See Places".

On 12 February 2008, a container wagon struck and partially destroyed the historic footbridge at the southern end of the station, joining Anzac Square with the industrial zone close to the wharves. Four people were on the bridge, with one suffering minor injuries when she fell 4.5 metres. Reconstruction of a footbridge of similar design on the same site was carried out in September–October 2008.

In 2020 the railway station was used for filming scenes for the movie The Power of the Dog, for which Jane Campion won the Academy Award for Best Director.

Anzac Square and Anzac Avenue

Immediately outside the station is Anzac Square, which, despite its name, is roughly triangular in shape, and was extensively remodelled and extended in the 1990s to create a formal knot garden. Directly across the square is Lower Stuart Street, which leads to the city's centre, The Octagon, from where the station is clearly visible as a major landmark. The station thus forms a terminating vista for Lower Stuart Street.

The square is at the southern end of Anzac Avenue, a kilometre-long tree-lined street running roughly parallel to the railway, which leads to Logan Park. The central part of Anzac Avenue is part of State Highway 88, which links the central city with its port facilities at Port Chalmers, and was the northern end until 2011 when construction of the Forsyth Barr Stadium at University Plaza required re-routing of part of the highway.

Logan Park was the site of the 1925 New Zealand and South Seas Exhibition, and the avenue and square were named to commemorate the Australian and New Zealand Army Corps, the "ANZACs", who were New Zealand's main military force during the First World War. After the refurbishment of the square, a large plaque dedicated to New Zealand's Victoria Cross recipients was relocated to its northern end, close to the start of Anzac Avenue. This has since been relocated again, and now stands close to the city's main war memorial, the Dunedin Cenotaph in Queen's Gardens, 400 metres to the south.

Transport services

The station was served by daily sightseeing trains to Middlemarch or Pukerangi via the Taieri Gorge, and to Palmerston. Although lacking any facilities specific to bus travel, it is Dunedin's terminal for shuttle vans to Dunedin International Airport and for most long-distance buses other than Intercity, which has its own terminal nearby.

References

 Johnson, D. (1993) Dunedin: A pictorial history. Christchurch: Canterbury University Press.
Knight, H. and Wales, N. (1988) Buildings of Dunedin. Dunedin: John McIndoe.
McGill, D. and Sheehan, G. (1997) Landmarks: Notable historic buildings of New Zealand. Auckland: Godwit Publishing.

External links

Buildings and structures in Dunedin
Heritage New Zealand Category 1 historic places in Otago
Railway stations in New Zealand
Railway stations opened in 1906
Rail transport in Dunedin
George Troup buildings
Tourist attractions in Dunedin
Terminating vistas in New Zealand
1900s architecture in New Zealand
1900s in Dunedin
1906 establishments in New Zealand
Railway attractions in New Zealand
Central Dunedin
Transport buildings and structures in Otago